Merthyr Tydfil County Borough has 43 scheduled monuments. The prehistoric scheduled sites include many burial cairns and several defensive enclosures. The Roman period is represented by a Roman Road. The medieval periods include two inscribed stones, several house platforms and two castle sites. Finally the modern period has 14 sites, mainly related to Merthyr's industries, including coal mining, transportation and iron works. Almost all of Merthyr Tydfil was in the historic county of Glamorgan, with several of the northernmost sites having been in Brecknockshire.

Scheduled monuments have statutory protection. The compilation of the list is undertaken by Cadw Welsh Historic Monuments, which is an executive agency of the National Assembly of Wales. The list of scheduled monuments below is supplied by Cadw with additional material from RCAHMW and Glamorgan-Gwent Archaeological Trust.

Scheduled monuments in Merthyr Tydfil County Borough

See also
Grade I listed buildings in Merthyr Tydfil County Borough
Grade II* listed buildings in Merthyr Tydfil County Borough
List of Cadw properties
List of castles in Wales
List of hill forts in Wales
Historic houses in Wales
List of monastic houses in Wales
List of museums in Wales
List of Roman villas in Wales

References
Coflein is the online database of RCAHMW: Royal Commission on the Ancient and Historical Monuments of Wales, GGAT is the Glamorgan-Gwent Archaeological Trust, Cadw is the Welsh Historic Monuments Agency

Bibliography

Merthyr Tydfil
Scheduled Monuments
History of Merthyr Tydfil